The  is a suburban electric multiple unit (EMU) train type operated by West Japan Railway Company (JR-West) in the Kansai Region of Japan since March 1989.

Operations
 Tōkaidō Main Line (Biwako Line, JR Kyoto Line, JR Kobe Line) ( - , until 2023)
 Sanyō Main Line (JR Kobe Line) (Kōbe - , until 2023)
 Hokuriku Main Line (Biwako Line) ( - Maibara, until 2023)
 Kosei Line ( - )
 Osaka Loop Line (only on Rapid service, Regional Rapid service and Local train)
 Osaka Higashi Line (only on Local service, from 12 March 2022)
 Kansai Main Line (Yamatoji Line) ( - )
 Nara Line
 Sakurai Line (Manyō-Mahoroba Line)
 Wakayama Line ( - )
 Akō Line ( - , until 2023)
 Sanin Main Line (Sagano Line) ( - )
 Bantan Line  ( - , until 2023)

Formations
, the fleet consisted of 474 vehicles, formed as 2-, 4-, 6-, and 8-car sets, based at Kyoto, Nara, and Aboshi depots.

Aboshi Depot

8-car sets (A prefix)

6-car sets (B prefix)

4-car sets (C prefix)

Nara Depot

8-car sets (NB prefix)

6-car sets (NC prefix)

4-car sets (NA prefix)

2-car sets

Kyoto Depot

4-car sets (K prefix)

The KuMoHa 221 cars in some formations are equipped with a second de-icing pantograph.

Interior
Seating is arranged as 2+2 abreast transverse flip-over seats.

History
The first 221 series trains were introduced from the start of the revised timetable in March 1989.

The 221 series received the Laurel Prize in 1990.

Refurbishment

From December 2012, a programme of refurbishment started, which will ultimately cover the entire fleet of 474 vehicles. Interior improvements include new universal access toilets, provision of wheelchair spaces, and flip-up seating next to the doorways. The first refurbished set, 4-car set K12, was returned to revenue service on 11 January 2013.

References

Electric multiple units of Japan
West Japan Railway Company
Train-related introductions in 1989
1500 V DC multiple units of Japan
Kinki Sharyo multiple units
Kawasaki multiple units
Hitachi multiple units